is a railway station of the Chūō Main Line, East Japan Railway Company (JR East) in Enzan-Kamioso, in the city of Kōshū, Yamanashi Prefecture, Japan.

Lines
Enzan Station is served by the Chūō Main Line, and is 116.9 kilometers from the terminus of the line at Tokyo Station.

Station layout
The station consists of one ground level side platform and one ground level island platform, connected to the station building by a footbridge. The station has a Midori no Madoguchi staffed ticket office.

Platforms

History
Enzan Station was opened on 11 June 1903 as part of the Japanese Government Railways (JGR) Chūō Main Line from Hajikano to Kōfu. The JGR became the JNR (Japanese National Railways) after the end of World War II.  With the dissolution and privatization of the JNR on April 1, 1987, the station came under the control of the East Japan Railway Company. Automated turnstiles using the Suica IC Card system came into operation from October 16, 2004.

Passenger statistics
In fiscal 2017, the station was used by an average of 2086 passengers daily (boarding passengers only).

Surrounding area
former Katsunuma city hall

See also
 List of railway stations in Japan

References

 Miyoshi Kozo. Chuo-sen Machi to eki Hyaku-niju nen. JT Publishing (2009)

External links

JR East Enzan Station

Railway stations in Yamanashi Prefecture
Railway stations in Japan opened in 1903
Chūō Main Line
Stations of East Japan Railway Company
Kōshū, Yamanashi